Norwalk Township is one of the nineteen townships of Huron County, Ohio, United States. As of the 2010 census the population of the township was 3,591, of whom 3,228 lived in the unincorporated portions of the township. The current trustee for the town is Tom Moehle.

Geography
Located on the northern edge of the county, it borders the following townships:
Milan Township, Erie County - north
Berlin Township, Erie County - northeast corner
Townsend Township - east
Hartland Township - southeast corner
Bronson Township - south
Peru Township - southwest corner
Ridgefield Township - west
Oxford Township, Erie County - northwest corner

Two municipalities are located in Norwalk Township: most of the city of Norwalk — the county seat of Huron County — occupying the majority of the township, and part of the village of Milan in the north.

Name and history
Norwalk Township was named after Norwalk, Connecticut.

It is the only Norwalk Township statewide.

Government
The township is governed by a three-member board of trustees, who are elected in November of odd-numbered years to a four-year term beginning on the following January 1. Two are elected in the year after the presidential election and one is elected in the year before it. There is also an elected township fiscal officer, who serves a four-year term beginning on April 1 of the year after the election, which is held in November of the year before the presidential election. Vacancies in the fiscal officership or on the board of trustees are filled by the remaining trustees.

References

External links
County website

Townships in Huron County, Ohio
Townships in Ohio